Morum lorenzi is a species of sea snail, a marine gastropod mollusk, in the family Harpidae.

Description
The length of the shell attains 20.1 mm.

Distribution
The holotype was found on the St. Brandon shoals, western Indian Ocean.

References

lorenzi
Gastropods described in 2011